Lithuania has participated in the Eurovision Song Contest 22 times since its debut in 1994, where Ovidijus Vyšniauskas finished last, receiving "nul points". Lithuania withdrew from the contest, not returning until 1999.

As of 2022, Lithuania remains the only Baltic country that is yet to win the contest after wins for Estonia in 2001 and Latvia in 2002. However, since the introduction of the semi-final round in 2004, Lithuania has more final appearances than the other Baltic nations, with eleven, compared to eight for Estonia and six for Latvia.

History

2000s
Having been relegated from the 2000 contest the country returned in 2001 with Skamp and "You Got Style", the first Lithuanian song to include English. They received 35 points, placing 13th. However the following year, Aivaras could only manage to come second last with 12 points.

Since the semi-finals were introduced Lithuania again came last with Laura and the Lovers and "Little by Little". The following year the Lithuanian broadcaster Lietuvos Nacionalinis Radijas ir Televizija (LRT) sent LT United to the 2006 contest with the football chant-like song "We Are the Winners". They took Lithuania to the final for the first time since 2002, coming sixth in the final with 162 points, Lithuania's best placing as of 2022.

The following year Lithuania automatically qualified for the final, however 4Fun could not replicate LT United's success, coming 21st with only 28 points, 12 of which came from Ireland. In 2008 Jeronimas Milius failed to reach the final, coming 16th of 19 competing nations in the second semi-final.

Lithuania threatened to boycott the 2009 contest "if Russia continues to showcase power and ignores international law". The statement was made in reaction to the Russia's actions in the 2008 South Ossetia war. Culture Minister Jonas Jučas stated that it was too early to discuss the boycott since "spontaneous decisions might aggravate the efforts of diplomats" and thus make the situation worse. At the Eurovision Song Contest 2009, Lithuania qualified from the semi finals and at the end of the voting in the final had received 23 points, placing them 23rd.

2010s
LRT announced in December 2009 that, due to a lack of necessary funds, Lithuania would formally withdraw from the 2010 Contest. However, in the event that the necessary funds of 300,000 litas (€90,000) would be found the broadcaster announced that they would attempt to continue the country's participation. Ultimately, private company TEO LT provided the necessary funding and Lithuania participated in Oslo.

In 2011, Lithuania participated in the first semi-final on the 10 May 2011 and after coming fifth, qualified for the Final. In the final, Lithuania received 63 points, to finish 19th.

In 2012, Lithuania qualified for the final with Donny Montell and his song "Love Is Blind", placing 3rd with 104 points. They eventually finished 14th in the Grand Final.

In 2013, Lithuania qualified to the final with "Something" by Andrius Pojavis, placing 9th in the first semi-final, with 53 points, qualifying Lithuania to the final for the 3rd time in row. In the final, he ended on 22nd place with 17 points.

In 2014, Vilija didn't qualify to final finishing 11th of 15 entrants in the second semi-final, scoring 36 points.

In 2016, Donny Montell returned to the contest in 2016 and achieved Lithuania's best result of the decade, finishing ninth with "I've Been Waiting for This Night".

In 2018, Ieva Zasimauskaitė achieved Lithuania's fifth top 15 result, finishing 12th with "When We're Old".

2020s
In 2021, Lithuania qualified to the final with the song "Discoteque" by The Roop, placing 4th in the first semi-final with 203 points. In the final, The Roop reached 8th place with 220 points, thereby achieving Lithuania's second best result to date. The Roop was previously chosen to represent the country in the later-cancelled 2020 edition with "On Fire".

In 2022, Monika Liu performed her song "Sentimentai" in Lithuanian, which marked the second appearance of the language in the contest, and the first one since 1994, the song qualified from the semifinal. (except partial usage in 2001)

Participation overview

Songs by language

Awards

Winner by OGAE members

Barbara Dex Award

Related involvement

Heads of delegation

Jury members
A five-member jury panel consisting of music industry professionals is made up for every participating country for the semi-finals and Grand Final of the Eurovision Song Contest, ranking all entries except for their own country's contribution. The juries' votes constitute 50% of the overall result alongside televoting.

Commentators and spokespersons

Other shows

Stage directors

Photo gallery

See also
 Lithuania in the Eurovision Dance Contest – Dance version of the Eurovision Song Contest.
 Lithuania in the Junior Eurovision Song Contest – Junior  version of the Eurovision Song Contest.
 Lithuania in the Eurovision Young Musicians – A competition organised by the EBU for musicians aged 18 years and younger.

Notes

References

 
Countries in the Eurovision Song Contest